Richard Morton Sherman (born June 12, 1928) is an American songwriter who specialized in musical films with his brother Robert B. Sherman. According to the official Walt Disney Company website and independent fact checkers, "the Sherman Brothers were responsible for more motion picture musical song scores than any other songwriting team in film history."

Some of the Sherman Brothers' best known songs were incorporated into live action and animation musical films including: Mary Poppins, The Happiest Millionaire, The Jungle Book, The Many Adventures of Winnie the Pooh, Chitty Chitty Bang Bang, Snoopy Come Home, Bedknobs and Broomsticks, The Slipper and the Rose, and Charlotte's Web.

Their most well known work, however, remains "It's a Small World (After All)", written for the theme park attraction of the same name.  According to Time, it may be the most (publicly) performed song in history.

Early life 
Richard Morton Sherman was born in New York City to Russian Jewish immigrants, Rosa (Dancis) and Al Sherman. Together with his older brother Robert, "The Sherman Brothers" eventually followed in their songwriting father's footsteps to form a long-lasting songwriting partnership.

Following seven years of frequent cross-country moves, the Sherman family finally settled down in Beverly Hills, California in 1937. During Richard's years at Beverly Hills High School, he became fascinated with music and studied several instruments, including the flute, piccolo, and piano. At his 1946 high school graduation, Sherman and classmate André Previn played a musical duet with Previn on piano and Sherman on flute. The Sherman Brothers later won a 1964 Oscar for Music Score – Substantially Original for Mary Poppins and a second for Best Original Song for "Chim Chim Cher-ee".

Army service and education 
In 1953 Sherman was drafted into United States Army, being assigned to the Army Band and glee club. Serving as musical conductor for both groups from 1953 until his honorable discharge in 1955, he was stationed solely in the United States during his time in the service. During this time, his brother Robert worked with other songwriters.

As a student at Bard College, Sherman majored in music, writing numerous sonatas and "art songs". His ambition to write the "great american symphony" eventually led him to write songs.

Career 
Within two years of graduating, Sherman and his brother Robert began writing songs together on a challenge from their father, Al Sherman, a successful popular songwriter in the "Tin Pan Alley" days ("No! No! A Thousand Times No!!", "You Gotta Be a Football Hero").

In 1958, Sherman's brother Robert founded the music publishing company, Music World Corporation, which later worked with Disney's BMI publishing arm, Wonderland Music Company. That same year, the Sherman Brothers had their first Top Ten hit with "Tall Paul", which was sung by Annette Funicello. The success of this song attracted the attention of Walt Disney who eventually hired the Sherman Brothers as Staff Songwriters for Walt Disney Studios. While at Disney, the Sherman Brothers wrote what is perhaps their most recognized song: "It's a Small World (After All)" for the 1964 New York World's Fair.

In 1965, the Sherman brothers won 2 Academy Awards for Mary Poppins – Best Original Score, which included "Feed The Birds", "Supercalifragilisticexpialidocious"; and Best Original Song, "Chim Chim Cher-ee". Since Mary Poppins premiere, Robert B. Sherman subsequently earned 9 Academy Award nominations, 2 Grammy Awards, 4 Grammy Award nominations and 23 gold and platinum albums.

Robert and Richard Sherman worked directly for Walt Disney until Disney's death in 1966. After leaving the company, the brothers worked freelance as songwriters on scores of motion pictures, television shows, theme park exhibits and stage musicals.

Their first non-Disney assignment came with Albert R. Broccoli's motion picture production Chitty Chitty Bang Bang in 1968 which garnered the brothers their third Academy Award Nomination. In 1973, the Sherman Brothers made history by becoming the only Americans ever to win First Prize at the Moscow Film Festival for Tom Sawyer for which they also authored the screenplay.

The Slipper and the Rose was picked to be the Royal Command Performance of the year and was attended by Queen Elizabeth. A modern musical adaptation of the classic Cinderella story, Slipper also features both song-score and screenplay by the Sherman Brothers. That same year the Sherman Brothers received their star on the Hollywood "Walk of Fame" directly across from Grauman's Chinese Theater.

Their numerous other Disney and non-Disney top box office film credits include The Jungle Book (1967), The Aristocats (1970), The Parent Trap (1961), The Parent Trap (1998), Charlotte's Web (1973), The Many Adventures of Winnie the Pooh (1977), Snoopy, Come Home (1972), Bedknobs and Broomsticks (1971) and Little Nemo: Adventures In Slumberland (1992).

Outside the motion picture realm, their Tony-nominated Over Here! (1974) was the biggest-grossing original Broadway Musical of that year. The Sherman Brothers have also written numerous top-selling songs, including "You're Sixteen", which holds the distinction of reaching Billboard's Top Ten twice; first with Johnny Burnette in 1960 and then with Ringo Starr fourteen years later. Other top-ten hits include, "Pineapple Princess", "Let's Get Together" and more.

In 2000, the Sherman brothers wrote the song score for Disney's blockbuster film: The Tigger Movie (2000). This film marked the brothers' first major motion picture for the Disney company in over 28 years.

In 2002, the stage musical Chitty Chitty Bang Bang premiered in London. It was the most successful stage show ever produced at the London Palladium, boasting the longest run in that century-old theatre's history. In early 2005 a second Chitty company premiered on Broadway (New York City) at the Foxwoods Theatre (then the Hilton Theatre). The Sherman Brothers wrote an additional six songs specifically for the new stage productions.

In 2003, four Sherman brothers' musicals ranked in the "Top 10 Favorite Children's Films of All Time" in a (British) nationwide poll reported by the BBC. The Jungle Book (1967)_ranked at #7, Mary Poppins (1964) ranked at #8, The Aristocats (1970) ranked at #9 and Chitty Chitty Bang Bang (1968) topped the list at #1.

A new Disney and Cameron Mackintosh production of Mary Poppins: The Stage Musical made its world premiere at the Prince Edward Theatre in December 2004 and features the Sherman Brothers classic songs.

In June 2005, Richard M. Sherman was inducted into the Songwriters Hall of Fame with his brother. Chitty opened on Broadway in 2005 and commenced its first full UK tour in December 2005 with subsequent tours and/or tour dates in each year since. Mary Poppins opened on Broadway in 2006.

In 2008 Mary Poppins embarked on a UK tour as well as a world tour beginning in Göteborg, Sweden. Chitty embarked on a tour of 29 cities in the U.S. which ended in 2009.

Recently, Sherman once again collaborated with Disney in three of its live-action films, having rewritten the song "I Wan'na Be Like You" for Jon Favreau's 2016 remake of The Jungle Book. As the film featured the song's performer, King Louie, as a Gigantopithecus, Sherman rewrote it to fit the character's depiction. He also wrote three new songs for the 2018 film Christopher Robin, titled "Goodbye Farewell", "Busy Doing Nothing", and "Christopher Robin", the last two performed by Sherman. Sherman also acted as a music consultant for Mary Poppins Returns, the sequel to Mary Poppins. Sherman will also write new songs for the upcoming musical stage adaptation of The Jungle Book.

Personal life 
In the late 1940s, while Richard was attending Bard college, he was briefly married to Corrine Newman. They had one child, Lynda. In 1957 Richard married Ursula Elizabeth Gluck; the couple had two children, Gregory Vincent and Victoria Lynn. Sherman has six grandchildren.

Following Robert Sherman's relocation from Beverly Hills to London, England, the brothers continued to collaborate musically. They credited the ability to do so long-distance to technology via fax, e-mail, and the low-cost international telephone service. Both brothers frequently traveled between Los Angeles, New York, and London working together on various musical plays until Robert's death in 2012.

Richard and Elizabeth have been married for over 60 years and remain active. They continue to live in Beverly Hills, California.

Achievements, honors, tributes 

 In 2000, the Sherman Brothers wrote the award-winning score to The Tigger Movie which achieved number one status in both theatrical box office and video sales.
 The Sherman Brothers' classic motion picture, Chitty Chitty Bang Bang was adapted into a London West End Musical in 2002 and premiered at the London Palladium on April 16, 2002, featuring many new songs and a reworked score by both Sherman Brothers. It was nominated for a 2003 Laurence Olivier Theatre Award for Best New Musical. The Sherman Brothers each received the "Musical Theatre Award" from the Variety Club of Great Britain that year as well for Chitty.  Chitty finished a record breaking, three and a half-year run at the Palladium becoming the longest running show in the theatre's century long history. 2004 saw the premiere of Mary Poppins on the stage. In 2005, Poppins was nominated for nine Olivier Awards. In 2005 Chitty went to Broadway and was nominated for 9 Tonys and also began its nationwide (UK) tour.
 On June 9, 2005, Sherman was inducted into the Songwriters Hall of Fame alongside Bill Withers, Steve Cropper, John Fogerty, Isaac Hayes, David Porter and his brother, Robert B. Sherman.
 On November 16, 2006, the Cameron Mackintosh/Disney production of Mary Poppins made its Broadway premiere at the New Amsterdam Theater featuring the Sherman Brothers' classic songs.
 During a London press junket promoting the 40th anniversary DVD rerelease of The Jungle Book, Robert and Richard Sherman were witnessed by press working on a new song for Inkas in the same Brown's Hotel room where The Jungle Book was originally penned by the British writer, Rudyard Kipling, over a hundred years earlier.
 In February 2008 Chitty Chitty Bang Bang began a second UK tour. In 2008 and 2009, Poppins premiered in numerous cities throughout the world including: Stockholm, Copenhagen, Budapest, Toronto, Shanghai, Sydney, Johannesburg, Amsterdam, Buenos Aires, São Paulo and Helsinki. Full UK and US tours of Poppins are also scheduled to commence in 2008 and 2009 respectively.
 On November 17, 2008, Robert and Richard Sherman were awarded the National Medal of Arts at the White House by President George W. Bush in the East Room.  The National Medal of Arts is an award and title created by the Congress of the United States in 1984, for the purpose of honoring artists and patrons of the arts. It is the highest honor conferred to an individual artist on behalf of the people. Honorees are selected by the National Endowment for the Arts (NEA), and ceremoniously presented the award by the President of the United States.
 In May 2009, a documentary called The Boys: The Sherman Brothers' Story was released. In October 2009, Disney released a 59 track, two CD compendium of their work for the studio spanning forty-two years. The CD is entitled "The Sherman Brothers Songbook".
 On March 11, 2010, the Sherman Brothers were presented with a Window on Mainstreet Disneyland in Anaheim, California in honor of their contribution to Disney theme parks. On May 17, 2010, the "Career Achievement Award" at The Theatre Museum's 2010 Awards Gala.
 On May 21, 2011, the Sherman Brothers were each awarded honorary doctorate degrees in Fine Arts from their alma mater, Bard College.  This was Robert's second honorary doctorate. His first was granted by Lincoln College on May 12, 1990.
 In 2013 Richard was musical consultant for the live-action production of The Jungle Book at the Goodman Theatre in Chicago, IL.
 In 2014 the Sherman Brothers, alongside their father, Al Sherman were the subjects of a London musical concert entitled, A Spoonful of Sherman hosted by Richard's nephew, Robert J. Sherman. The concert received generally very positive reviews including four stars from the London Times. A CD produced by Nick Lloyd Webber was released by SimG Records in 2015.
 In 2015, Sherman was awarded the Diane Disney Miller Lifetime Achievement Award by The Walt Disney Family Museum. 
 In 2017 A Spoonful of Sherman was revived, playing at the venue, "Live at Zédel" in London.
 On July 31, 2018, the Walt Disney Studios in Burbank, California renamed Soundstage A the Sherman Brothers Stage.
 In 2018 the first A Spoonful of Sherman UK/Ireland Tour began with previews on February 14, 2018, at the EM Forester Theatre in Tonbridge, Kent. The tour played in 28 cities in England, Scotland, Wales and the Republic of Ireland.  Cast members for the tour included Sophie-Louise Dann, Mark Read, Glen Facey, Jenna Innes and Ben Stock.

List of works

Major film scores 

 The Parent Trap, 1961
 Big Red, 1962
 In Search of the Castaways, 1962
 Summer Magic, 1963
 The Sword in the Stone, 1963
 Mary Poppins, 1964
 Follow Me, Boys! 1966
 The Happiest Millionaire, 1967
 The Jungle Book, 1967
 The One and Only, Genuine, Original Family Band, 1968
 Chitty Chitty Bang Bang, 1968
 The Aristocats, 1970
 Bedknobs and Broomsticks, 1971
 Snoopy, Come Home, 1972
 Charlotte's Web, 1973
 The Adventures of Tom Sawyer, 1973
 The Adventures of Huckleberry Finn, 1974
 The Slipper and the Rose, 1976
 The Many Adventures of Winnie the Pooh, 1977
 The Magic of Lassie, 1978
 Magic Journeys, 1982
 Winnie the Pooh and a Day for Eeyore, 1983
 Little Nemo: Adventures in Slumberland, 1989
 Winnie the Pooh: Seasons of Giving, 1999
 The Tigger Movie, 2000
 Iron Man 2, (Composed the song Make Way For Tomorrow Today. Instrumental versions were later featured in Captain America: The First Avenger and Avengers: Endgame)
 The Jungle Book, 2016
 Christopher Robin, 2018

Motion picture screenplays 
 A Symposium on Popular Songs, 1962
 Mary Poppins, 1964 (*treatment only),
 The Adventures of Tom Sawyer, 1973
 The Adventures of Huckleberry Finn, 1974
 The Slipper and the Rose, 1976
 The Magic of Lassie, 1978
 Ferdinand the Bull, 1986 (*TV screenplay)

Stage musicals 

 Victory Canteen, 1971 (Ivar Theatre, L.A.)
 Over Here!, 1974 (Broadway, NY)
 Dawgs, 1983 (Variety Arts Center, L.A.)
 Busker Alley, 1995 (U.S. Tour)
 Chitty Chitty Bang Bang, 2002 (London)
 Mary Poppins, 2004 (London)
 On the Record 2004-5 (U.S. Tour)
 Chitty Chitty Bang Bang, 2005 (Broadway, NY)
 Chitty Chitty Bang Bang, 2005 (UK Tour)
 Busker Alley, 2006 (Broadway, NY - *one night only)
 Mary Poppins, 2006 (Broadway, NY)
 Chitty Chitty Bang Bang, 2007 (Singapore)
 Mary Poppins, 2008 (UK Tour)
 Chitty Chitty Bang Bang, 2008 (Second UK Tour)
 Mary Poppins, 2008 (Stockholm)
 Mary Poppins, 2009 (US Tour)
 Mary Poppins, 2009 (Copenhagen)
 Mary Poppins, 2009 (Shanghai)
 Mary Poppins, 2010 (Australia)
 Mary Poppins, 2009 (South Africa)
 Mary Poppins, 2009 (The Hague)
 Mary Poppins, 2009 (Helsinki)
 Mary Poppins, 2012 (Budapest)
 Summer Magic, 2012 (Morristown, Tennessee)
 The Jungle Book, 2013 (Chicago, Illinois)
 The Jungle Book, 2013 (Boston, Massachusetts)
 A Spoonful of Sherman, 2014 (London)
 Mary Poppins, 2015 (Vienna, Austria)
 Chitty Chitty Bang Bang, 2015–16 (UK Tour)
 Mary Poppins, 2015–16 (UK Tour)
 A Spoonful of Sherman, 2017 (London)
 A Spoonful of Sherman, 2018 (UK/Ireland Tour)
 A Spoonful of Sherman, 2019 (San Jose, CA)
 A Spoonful of Sherman, 2019 (Singapore)
 Mary Poppins, 2019 (London)
 Bedknobs and Broomsticks, 2021 (UK Tour)

Theme park songs 
 There's a Great Big Beautiful Tomorrow for Carousel of Progress
 The Best Time of Your Life for Carousel of Progress
 Miracles from Molecules for Adventure Thru Inner Space
 One Little Spark for Journey into Imagination
 Magic Journeys for Magic Journeys
 The Many Adventures of Winnie the Pooh
 Pooh's Hunny Hunt
 it's a small world (after all) for the 1964 New York World's Fair attraction, Pepsi Presents WALT DISNEY'S "it's a small world" – a Salute to UNICEF and the World's Children, then adapted to each Disney Park installation of "It's a Small World"
 The Astuter Computer Revue for the 1982 premiere of the CommuniCore Exhibit at EPCOT.
 Magic Highways for Rocket Rods
 Making Memories for Magic Journeys
 The Tiki, Tiki, Tiki Room for Walt Disney's Enchanted Tiki Room
 We Meet the World with Love and Meet the World for the same exhibit in Tokyo Disneyland
 Kiss Goodnight exit music from Disneyland Forever for Disneyland's 60th Anniversary Nighttime Fireworks Spectacular show, originally sung by Ashley Brown.

Professional awards 

 Academy Awards 
1965 Won Academy Award in the category of "Best Original Song" for  "Chim Chim Cher-ee" from Mary Poppins
1965 Won Academy Award in the category of "Best Substantially Original Score" for Mary Poppins
1969 Nominated Academy Award in the category of "Best Original Song" for  "Chitty Chitty Bang Bang" from Chitty Chitty Bang Bang
1972 Nominated Academy Award in the category of "Best Original Song" for "The Age of Not Believing" from Bedknobs and Broomsticks
1972 Nominated Academy Award in the category of ""Best Scoring Adaptation and Original Song Score" for Bedknobs and Broomsticks
1974 Nominated Academy Award in the category of "Best Scoring Adaptation and Original Song Score" for Tom Sawyer
1978 Nominated Academy Award in the category of "Best Original Song" for "The Slipper and the Rose Waltz (He/She Danced with Me)" from The Slipper and the Rose
1978 Nominated Academy Award in the category of "Best Original Song Score & Its Adaptation Or Best Adaptation Score" for The Slipper and the Rose
1979 Nominated Academy Award in the category of "Best Original Song" for "When You're Loved" from The Magic of Lassie

 Annie Awards 

2000 Nominated Annie in the category of "Outstanding Individual Achievement for Music in an Animated Feature Production" for the song "Round My Family Tree" from The Tigger Movie
2003 "Winsor McCay Award" for lifetime achievement and contribution to animation

 BAFTA Awards 
1977 Nominated "Anthony Asquith Award for Film Music" for The Slipper and the Rose

 BMI 
1977 "Pioneer Award" awarded in Los Angeles, California.
1991 "Lifetime Achievement Award" awarded at the Beverly Wilshire Hotel in Los Angeles, California.

 Christopher Award 
1964 "Christopher Award" for "Best Original Song Score" for Mary Poppins
1973 "Christopher Award" for "Best Original Song Score" for Tom Sawyer

 Disney 
1985 "Mousecar" awarded at the Hollywood Bowl in Hollywood, California in front of 20 thousand people.
1990 "Disney Legends" awarded at the Walt Disney Studios in Burbank, California.
2010 Main Street, U.S.A. Window presented at Disneyland in Anaheim, California in honor of the Sherman Brothers' contribution to Disney theme parks.

 Golden Globes 
1965 Nominated Golden Globe in the category of "Best Original Score" for Mary Poppins
1969 Nominated Golden Globe in the category of "Best Original Score" for Chitty Chitty Bang Bang
1969 Nominated Golden Globe in the category of "Best Original Song" for Chitty Chitty Bang Bang
1974 Nominated Golden Globe in the category of "Best Original Score" for Tom Sawyer
1977 Nominated Golden Globe in the category of "Best Original Score" for The Slipper and the Rose

 Golden Videocassette Award 
1984 Best Selling Video Cassette (of all time) for Mary Poppins

 Grammy Awards 
1965 Won Grammy in the category of "Best Original Score for a Motion Picture or Television Show" for Mary Poppins
1965 Won Grammy in the category of "Best Recording for Children" for Mary Poppins
1966 Nominated Grammy in the category of "Best Recording for Children" for Winnie the Pooh and the Honey Tree
1968 Nominated Grammy in the category of "Best Recording for Children" for The Jungle Book
1970 Nominated Grammy in the category of "Best Recording for Children" for Chitty Chitty Bang Bang
1971 Nominated Grammy in the category of "Best Recording for Children" for The Aristocats
1973 Nominated Grammy in the category of "Best Original Score for a Children's Show" for Snoopy Come Home
1974 Nominated Grammy in the category of "Best Original Score for a Musical Show" for Over Here!
1975 Won Grammy in the category of "Best Recording for Children" for Winnie the Pooh and Tigger Too

 Laurel Awards 
1965 Won "Golden Laurel" in the category of "Best Song" "Chim Chim Cher-ee" for Mary Poppins
1965 2nd Place "Golden Laurel" in the category of Music Men"
1966 3rd place "Golden Laurel" in the category of "Best Song" "That Darn Cat!" for That Darn Cat! Moscow Film Festival
1973 First place Award in the category of "Best Music" for Tom Sawyer National Medal of Arts 
2008 National Medal of Arts awarded to Richard and Robert Sherman on November 17, 2008, at the White House by President George W. Bush.  This is the highest honor the United States Government bestows on artists.

 Olivier Awards 
2002 Nominated "Best Musical" for Chitty Chitty Bang Bang.

 Songwriters Hall of Fame 
2005 induction at the Marriott Hotel on Times Square in New York City.

 Theatre Museum Award 
2010 Career Achievement Award presented on May 17, 2010, at The Players Club in New York City.

 Variety Club Awards 
2003 Won "Best Musical" for Chitty Chitty Bang Bang.

 Walk of Fame 
1976 A Star on the Hollywood Walk of Fame awarded to "Richard & Robert Sherman" on November 17, 1976, located at 6914 Hollywood Blvd.

 References 

 Bibliography 
 Sherman, Robert B. Walt's Time: from before to beyond. Santa Clarita: Camphor Tree Publishers, 1998.
 Greene, Katherine and Richard. Inside The Dream: The Personal Story of Walt Disney. New York: Disney Editions, 2001.
 Peterson, Monique. Disney's The Little Big Book of Pooh. New York: Disney Editions, 2002.
 Tietyen, David. The Musical World of Walt Disney''. Milwaukee, Wisconsin: Hal Leonard Publishing Corporation, 1990.

External links 

 Audio Interview with Richard M. Sherman on the WDW Radio Show by Lou Mongello
 
 
Richard M. Sherman at SoundUnwound
Richard Sherman Interview – NAMM Oral History Library (2016)

1928 births
American flautists
American male screenwriters
American musical theatre composers
American musical theatre lyricists
American people of Ukrainian-Jewish descent
Annie Award winners
Animation composers
Bard College alumni
Best Original Song Academy Award-winning songwriters
Best Original Music Score Academy Award winners
Beverly Hills High School alumni
Broadway composers and lyricists
Disney imagineers
Grammy Award winners
Jewish American composers
Jewish American musicians
Jewish American songwriters
Living people
Military personnel from New York City
Screenwriters from California
Screenwriters from New York (state)
Richard M.
Richard M.
Songwriters from New York (state)
Songwriters from California
United States National Medal of Arts recipients
Walt Disney Animation Studios people
Walt Disney Theatrical